The Rikbaktsa language, also spelled Aripaktsa, Erikbatsa, Erikpatsa and known ambiguously as Canoeiro, is a language spoken by the Rikbaktsa people of Mato Grosso, Brazil, that forms its own branch of the Macro-Gê languages.

As in other languages of the area, word endings indicate the gender of the speaker. Rikbaktsa is a subject-object-verb language.

Most Rikbaktsa can speak both Rikbaktsa and Portuguese.  Younger individuals tend to speak Portuguese more frequently and fluently than their elders, but older individuals generally struggle with Portuguese and use it only with non-indigenous Brazilians.

Jolkesky (2016) also notes that there are lexical similarities with the Cariban languages.

Locations
The 22nd edition of Ethnologue reports that it is spoken around confluence of the Sangue River and Juruena River in:
Japuira on the east bank of the Juruena River, between the Arinos River and Sangue River
Posto Escondido on the west bank of the Juruena River (9 villages, 14 settlements)

Phonology 

 /i, u/ can be heard as [ɪ, ʊ] when in syllable-final position.
 /e, o/ can be heard as [ɛ, ɔ] when in unstressed syllables.
 /a/ is heard as [ʌ] in final unstressed syllables, as [æ] when following /tʃ/ heard as [tʃʲ], and as [ɑ] when occurring after the sequence /ku/.

 A glottal stop [ʔ] can also be heard in initial and final position when before and after vowels.
 /d/ can be palatalized as [dʲ] when before /i/.
 /t͡ʃ/ can be palatalized as [t͡ʃʲ] when in front of /a/.
 /p, k/ can be heard as aspirated [pʰ, kʰ] when before an accented syllable.
 /k/ can be heard as voiced [ɡ] when before voiced consonants.
 /w/ can be heard as [β] when in stressed syllable before front vowels.
 Sounds /ɾ, w, h/ can be heard as nasal [ɾ̃, w̃, h̃] when in nasal vowel positions.

Vocabulary
Loukotka (1968) lists the following basic vocabulary items.

{| class="wikitable"
! gloss !! Erikbaktsa
|-
| one || aistuːba
|-
| ear || ka-spi
|-
| tooth || írata
|-
| hand || ka-shuisha
|-
| woman || matutsi
|-
| water || pihʔik
|-
| fire || idoː
|-
| stone || harahairi
|-
| maize || uanátsi
|}

References

Nuclear Macro-Jê languages
Languages of Brazil
Indigenous languages of South America (Central)
Rikbaktsa
Subject–object–verb languages
Endangered indigenous languages of the Americas
Mamoré–Guaporé linguistic area